Alan Moorcroft FRPSL is a past President of the Royal Philatelic Society London.

He is also a member of the National Philatelic Society and the Channel Islands Specialists Society.

References

Living people
British philatelists
Year of birth missing (living people)
Presidents of the Royal Philatelic Society London
Place of birth missing (living people)
21st-century British people